Phanomorpha icelomorpha is a moth in the family Crambidae. It was described by Turner in 1908. It is found in Australia, where it has been recorded from Western Australia.

References

Moths described in 1908
Heliothelini